Saidi Kyeyune (born 1 January 1993) is a Ugandan footballer who plays as a midfielder for Uganda Revenue Authority SC and the Ugandan national team.

International career
In January 2014, coach Milutin Sedrojevic, invited him to be included in the Uganda national football team for the 2014 African Nations Championship. The team placed third in the group stage of the competition after beating Burkina Faso, drawing with Zimbabwe and losing to Morocco.

International goals
Scores and results list Uganda's goal tally first.

References

External links
 

Living people
Uganda A' international footballers
2014 African Nations Championship players
Ugandan footballers
Proline FC players
1993 births
Association football midfielders
Uganda international footballers
Sportspeople from Kampala
Uganda Revenue Authority SC players
2020 African Nations Championship players